Müncheberg (Mark) station is a railway station in the municipality of Müncheberg in the Märkisch-Oderland district of Brandenburg, Germany. It is served by the line .

References

Railway stations in Brandenburg
Railway stations in Germany opened in 1867
1867 establishments in Prussia
Buildings and structures in Märkisch-Oderland